Tsuen Wan Park is a park in Hong Kong. It is located in Wing Shun Street/Yeung Uk Road near Tsuen Wan Ferry Pier in Tsuen Wan, New Territories. The park was opened to the public on 30October 1998. It is managed by the Leisure and Cultural Services Department of the Hong Kong government.

The park opens from 6:30 (6:30 am) to 23:00 (11:00 pm) daily.

Features
Since it is located at the coastal area, the maritime theme was adopted in designing the project and forms an integral part of the park. The park consists of a gateball court, four tennis courts, an amphitheatre, children play and cycling areas, fitness station, artificial lake and fountains as well as landscaped garden.

The park has a waterfront promenade along the Rambler Channel. The Tsuen Wan Pier is located here. The promenade continues to the north (beyond the park boundary) to Chai Wan Kok, and to the south to the Tsuen Wan Riviera Park, which opened before Tsuen Wan Park.

The four-storey Tsuen Wan Sports Centre opened at the park in October 2018. The complex contains a 1,900-seat main arena, a secondary hall with capacity for 200 people, a children's playroom, a fitness room, an outdoor climbing wall, a table tennis room, dance rooms, and multi-purpose rooms.

See also
 List of urban public parks and gardens in Hong Kong

References

External links

 

Urban public parks and gardens in Hong Kong
Tsuen Wan